This is a list of notable people executed by Francoist Spain.

A 

 Manuel Acero* Pere Adrover Fort
 Lorenzo Aguirre
 José Alarcón
 Otilio Alba Polo
 Nicasio Álvarez de Sotomayor
 David Álvarez Flores
 José Aranguren, General of the Guardia Civil
 Luis Arráez Martínez
 Guillermo Ascanio
 Antonio Azarola y Gresillón, rear admiral of the Spanish Republican Navy

B 

 Humberto Baena
 Aquilino Barrachina
 Francisco Barreiro
 Domingo Batet, General of the Spanish Republican Army
 Rafael Battestini Gaulp
 Francisco Bedoya Gutiérrez
 Fernando Berenguer de las Cagigas
 Celestí Boada
 Cayetano Bolívar
 Ernesto Botella Gisbert
 Alexandre Bóveda
 Javier Bueno
 Justo Bueno Pérez
 Ricardo Burillo Stholle
 Joan Busquets Queralt

C 

 Los Cinco de Otero
 Valentín Cabello
 Pascual Cabrera Quemades
 Sinesio Calderón, at the Cortijo del Enjembraero
 Luis Calvo Calavia
 Miguel Campins
 Juana Capdevielle
 Vicent Miquel Carceller
 Benigno Cardeñoso
 Manuel Carrasco i Formiguera
 Ángel Carrasco Nolasco
 Ángel Carrero Sancho
 Manuel Cascón Briega
 Salvador Castells Mas
 Manuel Castro Molina
 José Castro Veiga
 Santiago Catena
 José Cazorla Maure
 Tomás Centeno
 Atilano Coco
 Lluís Companys, president of Generalitat de Catalunya
 Luis Corbí
 Antonio Cortés, at the Cortijo del Enjembraero
 Francisco Cruz Salido
 Aquiles Cuadra

D 
Emili Darder
Carmelo Delgado Delgado
Camilo Díaz Baliño
José María Díaz y Díaz Villaamil
 Isidoro Diéguez Dueñas
María Domínguez
 Juan José Domínguez Muñoz
Luis Dorado
Julio Durán Pérez

E 
 Francisco Javier Elola
 Lluís Escaler
 Isidro Escandell
 Antonio Escobar Huertas, General of the Republican Army
 Etelvino Vega
 Rafael Expósito

F 
 Josep Fàbrega
 Josep Lluís i Facerias
 José Antonio Fernández Vega
 Joaquin Fernández Gálvez
 Baldomero Fernández Ladreda
 Félix Figueras Aragay
 Ángel Fuertes Vidosa

G 

 Vicente Galarza
 Pedro Luis de Gálvez
 Antonio Gan Vargas
 Cristino García Granda
 Federico García Lorca
 Rosendo García Montesinos
 Ramón García Sanz
 Juan García Suárez
 Jaume Garcias
 Ángel Garvín
 Jaime Girabau
 Manuel Girón
 Carlos Gómez Carrera
 José Gómez Gayoso
 José Gómez Osorio
 Eliseo Gómez Serrano
 Perfecto González
 Armando González Corral
 Pedro González González (mayor)
 Isidre Grañé
 Julián Grimau
 José Guerra Lozano
 Ramón Guerreiro

H 
Joaquín Heredia
Horacio Hermoso Araujo
Manuel Hernández Arteaga
Miguel Hernández, poet 
Jesús-Vito Hernández Gil
Amado Hernández Pascual
Antonio Hernanz

I 

Antonio Iglesias, at the Cortijo del Enjembraero
Blas Infante
Aurelio Íñigo

J 
María la Jabalina
Diego Jaén
José María Jarabo, spree killer
Leoncio Jaso
Alexandre Jaume
Juanín
Timoteo Jurado

L 
Maravillas Lamberto
Federico Landrove López
Jesús Larrañaga
Domènec Latorre
Emilio Leciguyena
José María León Jiménez
Virgilio Leret Ruiz
José López Bouza
Tomás López da Torre
Avelino López Otero
Antonio López Sánchez-Prado
Domingo López Torres
Manuel Lozano Guillén
Rogelio Luque
Lurgorri
Manuel Lustres Rivas

M 

Antonio Mairal
Francisco Marcos Pelayo
Francesc Marquès Casadevall
Martín Márquez
Cayetano Martínez Artés
Toribio Martínez Cabrera, General of the Republican Army
Eduardo Medrano Rivas
Modesto Méndez Álvarez
Eustakio Mendizábal Benito
Manuel Merino, at the Cortijo del Enjembraero
Numen Mestre Ferrando
Vicent Miquel Carceller
Manuel Molina Conejero
Vicente Moliner Nadal
Camilo Molins Carreras, rear admiral of the Republican Navy
Anastasio Moreno
Manuel Moreno Barranco
Félix Morga
José Moya Navarro
Manuel Muñoz Martínez

N 
Victoriano Navascués
José Novo
Severiano Núñez
Gines Navarro De Rosa

O
Teodoro Olarte Aizpuru
Antonio Oliver Villanueva
Teodoro del Olmo
Tiburcio Osácar
Angel Otaegi Etxeberria

P 

Joan Peiró
Jon Paredes Manot Txiki
José Pellicer Gandía
Francisco Pérez Carballo
Juan Pérez Mendoza
Joaquín Pérez Salas
Alejandro Peris
Juan Peset
Fernando Piñuela
José Piqueras
Salvador Puig Antich
Joaquim Puig Pidemunt
Domènec Puigredon

Q 
Antonio María Ques Ventayol
Jaime Quintanilla
Heriberto Quiñones González

R 

Carles Rahola Llorens
Luis Ramírez Palma
Tomás Ramón Amat
Aurelio Ramos Acosta
Cayetano Redondo
Rufino Redondo
Pere Reus Bordoy
Emiliano-María Revilla
José Rico Martín
Severino Rivas
Luis Rodríguez Figueroa
Juan Rodríguez Lozano
Urbano R. Moledo
José Rodríguez-Medel
Josep Rodríguez Martínez
José María Romero Martínez
Carlos Rubiera Rodríguez
Luis Rufilanchas
Manuel Ruiz Maya

S 
Mariano Sáez Morilla
Francesc Sabaté Llopart
Quirino Salvadores
Armengol Sampérez
Ignacio San Pedro Chocolonea
Felipe Sandoval
Ángel Sánchez Batea
José Luis Sánchez Bravo
Antonio Seoane Sánchez
Basiliso Serrano
Manuel Sánchez-Badajoz
Modesto Sánchez Cadenas
José Sánchez Gómez "El Timbalero"
José Sánchez Vidal
Primitivo Santa Cecilia
Juan José Santa Cruz
Juan Santana Vega
José Carlos Schwartz
Luis Sendín
Tomás Seguí
Manuel Sender
Antonio Seoane Sánchez
Ignacio Seoane
Basiliso Serrano
Luis Solá Padró
Humberto Solleiro
Carlos Soto Romero
Manuel Suárez Castro
Alfredo Suárez Ferrín
Juan Antonio Suárez Picallo
Josep Suñol

T 

 Las Trece Rosas
 Vicente Talens Inglá
Gregorio Tobajas
Alfredo Torán
Jaume Torramadé
Apolinar Torres
Rafael Torres Escartín
Florentino Trapero
Anselmo Trejo Gallardo
Pablo Troyano

U
Felipe Urtiaga

V 
Julio Valdeón
Victorino Valle Luis
Pere Valverde Fuentes
Antonio Vayas Gutiérrez
Faustino Vázquez Carril
Ramón Valls Figuerola
Etelvino Vega
Rafael de Vega Barrera
Ángel Vera Coronel
Ramon Vila Capdevila
Salvador Vila Hernández
Gregorio Vilatela
Miguel Villalta Gisbert
José Villaverde Velo
José Vitini

W 

Georg Michael Welzel
Ernesto Winter

X
Frederic Xifré Masferrer

Y
Pablo Yagüe
Pablo Yanguas
Antonio Yáñez-Barnuevo

Z 
 Ricardo Zabalza Elorga
Matilde Zapata
Mariano Zapico
Julián Zugazagoitia

See also 
 Desaparecidos del franquismo
 Francoist Spain
 White Terror (Spain)

References 
 Biographical Dictionary of Spanish Socialism

External links
The Archives of the Repression in Spain: Clue to the impunity of Francoism
Francoist Spain
 
Executed
Executed